Tavi or TAVI may refer to :

People
 Tavi (slave) (c. 1st century), slave of Gamaliel II
 Janne Tavi (born 1989), Finnish professional ice hockey player
 Tavi Gevinson (born 1996), American writer, magazine editor, actress and singer
 Tavi Murray, British geologist

Places
 Tavi State, a village in Gujarat, India and former princely state in Kathiawar
 Tavi, Iran, a village in Iran

Other
 Tavi, a Finnish border guard ship, later UK HMC Protector
 Transcatheter aortic valve implantation, a medical procedure

See also 
 River Tavy, Devon, England
 Tavey, a French commune
 Tawi (disambiguation)